Molo Audace is a pier located on the shores of Trieste, Italy right in the centre of the city, a few steps from Piazza Unità d'Italia and the Grand Canal. It separates the San Giorgio basin from the San Giusto basin of the Old Port.

History 
In 1740, the ship San Carlo sank in Trieste harbour, close to the shore. Instead of removing the wreck, it was decided to use it as the basis for the construction of a new pier, which was built between 1743 and 1751 and was named after San Carlo.

At the time, the pier was shorter than it is today; it measured only  in length and was joined to the land by a small wooden bridge. The bridge was also eliminated, joining the pier directly to the mainland.

At that time, both passenger and merchant ships docked at the San Carlo quay, with much movement of people and goods.

On 3 November 1918, at the end of World War I, the first ship of the Italian Royal Navy to enter the port of Trieste and dock at the San Carlo pier was the destroyer Audace, whose anchor is now displayed at the base of the Victory lighthouse.

In memory of this event, in March 1922, the name of the pier was changed to Molo Audace, and in 1925 a bronze compass rose was erected at the end of the pier, with an epigraph in the centre commemorating the landing, and on the side the inscription 'Cast in bronze enemy III November MCMXXV'. The rose, supported by a white stone column, replaced an earlier all-stone compass rose. The date MCMIL engraved on the column commemorates its restoration after being damaged during World War II.

Over time, as maritime traffic moved to other areas of the port, the Audace pier gradually lost its mercantile function, and today only passing boats occasionally dock there. The pier has thus remained a popular place for strolling, a walkway stretching out over the sea of undoubted charm, completing the promenade along the banks and in Piazza Unità d'Italia.

Gallery

References

Trieste
Piers in Italy